"Vibez" (stylized in all caps) is a song by American rapper DaBaby. It was released to US rhythmic contemporary radio through Interscope Records on March 31, 2020, as the third single from DaBaby's second studio album Kirk (2019). It peaked at number 21 on the US Billboard Hot 100.

Music video
The music video was released on October 1, 2019, and was directed by Reel Goats.

Reception 
Michael Saponara of Billboard called the video "reckless".

Critical reception 
Noah C of HotNewHipHop called the track "ebullient" and "ferocious". On a less positive note, Trent Clark of HipHopDX called the track a "reheated version of 'Suge'".

In media
In 2021, memes across the Internet spread in which a sound bite of DaBaby ad-libbing "Let's go!", taken from the song's intro, is played. Other related memes included a DaBaby's face superimposed over an image of a car, with the edited lyric "I will turn into a convertible", taken from his song Suge.

Charts

Weekly charts

Year-end charts

Certifications

Release history

References

2020 singles
2020 songs
DaBaby songs
Interscope Records singles
Songs written by DaBaby
Internet memes introduced in 2021